Grant William Veitch Harrold (born 1978 in Airdrie, Scotland) is a British former butler to King Charles III (when he was Prince of Wales), now a British etiquette expert, and broadcaster.

Career
He worked as a butler for Charles III from 2004 to 2011, when King Charles was Prince of Wales. Grant has also explained in recent interviews he also looked after William, Prince of Wales and Catherine, Princess of Wales during his time at Highgrove His first employers were Urs Schwarzenbach and Major Christopher Hanbury on the Ben Alder estate, where he began working in private service in 1997.

Based in Tetbury, Gloucestershire, Harrold now runs an etiquette and butler school. He also gives talks and demonstrations on afternoon tea etiquette, dinner parties etiquette and similar etiquette events. In 2014 Harrold's company Nicholas Veitch Limited alongside Blenheim Palace founded The Royal School of Butlers.

Media
Harrold first appeared regularly as the butler on the reality television programme Country House at Woburn Abbey between 2000 and 2003 whilst working for Robin Russell, 14th Duke of Bedford and his son Andrew Russell, 15th Duke of Bedford, and then in 2012 was part of the BBC Three series Be Your Own Boss.

Controversy 
In 2020, Harrold applied to register "The Royal Butler" as trademark for his business, however, the trademark was denied. Harrold had claimed that he had won the right to the trademark as part of a settlement when he left Royal service.

In 2021, he was criticised by Asian communities for suggesting that people should never eat rice with their hands, a practice common in many Asian countries.

References

1978 births
Living people
Scottish businesspeople
Scottish domestic workers
British butlers
People from Airdrie, North Lanarkshire